Thézac may refer to the following places in France:

 Thézac, Charente-Maritime, a commune in the Charente-Maritime department
 Thézac, Lot-et-Garonne, a commune in the Lot-et-Garonne department